Stephen David Baxter (born 1969) is a British historian. He has been Barron Fellow and Tutor in Medieval History at St Peter's College, Oxford, since 2014, and in 2020 he was awarded the title of Professor of Medieval History by the University of Oxford. He specialises in lordship in late Anglo-Saxon and early Norman England, and the Domesday Book.

Early life and education
Born in 1969, Baxter completed his undergraduate degree in modern history at Wadham College, Oxford, graduating in 1991 with a double first. From 1991 to 1997, he worked in the private sector, firstly for a strategic management consultancy firm and then an investment bank in London, before returning to Oxford to complete a doctorate at Christ Church between 1997 and 2001. His DPhil was awarded in 2002 for his thesis "The Leofwinesons: power, property and patronage in the early English kingdom", which was supervised by C. P. Wormald.

Academic career 
Between 2001 and 2004, Baxter was a junior research fellow at Magdalen College, Oxford. From 2004 to 2014, he taught medieval history at King's College, London, firstly as a lecturer and from 2009 as a reader in medieval history. In 2014, he was elected Barron Fellow and Tutor in Medieval History at St Peter's College, Oxford, and Clarendon Associate Professor of Medieval History in the University of Oxford's Department of History. In 2020, he was awarded the title of Professor of Medieval History by the University of Oxford.

Baxter was a co-director for the second phase of the AHRC-funded Prosopography of Anglo-Saxon England (PASE) project, alongside Dame Janet Nelson, Simon Keynes, Harold Short and John Bradley; this part of the database, which traced all English persons appearing in documentary sources from 1042 to c. 1100, was published online in 2009. Baxter was also a co-investigator of the AHRC-funded Exon Domesday research project (alongside Julia Crick and Peter A. Stokes); this took place from 2015 to 2018 and resulted in the publication of a new online text of the book and much other research into its content and compilation.

Bibliography

References 

1969 births
Living people
British historians
Alumni of Wadham College, Oxford
Alumni of Christ Church, Oxford
Fellows of Magdalen College, Oxford
Academics of King's College London
Fellows of St Peter's College, Oxford